Child of the Night may refer to:
 Child of the Night (1950 film), a Spanish drama film
 Child of the Night (novel), by Nancy Kilpatrick
 Enfantasme, a 1978 drama film also known as Child of the Night
 What the Peeper Saw, a 1972 horror film also known as Child of the Night

See also
 Children of the Night (disambiguation)
 Child of the Light, a 1991 novel by Janet Berliner and George Guthridge